Jay S. Skyler is a Professor of Medicine, Pediatrics and Psychology at the University of Miami Leonard M. Miller School of Medicine.

A graduate of Pennsylvania State University and Jefferson Medical College, he did his postgraduate training in Internal Medicine and in Endocrinology & Metabolism at Duke University Medical Center.

He was founding Editor-in-Chief of Diabetes Care from 1978 to 1982, and Editor-in-Chief of Diabetes Reviews during 1998 and 1999.

He has an h-index of 77 according to Google Scholar.

References

Year of birth missing (living people)
Living people
Pennsylvania State University alumni
Jefferson Medical College alumni
University of Miami faculty
People from Philadelphia